The Battle of Magersfontein was fought on 11 December 1899, at Magersfontein, near Kimberley, South Africa, on the borders of the Cape Colony and the independent republic of the Orange Free State. British forces under Lieutenant General Lord Methuen were advancing north along the railway line from the Cape to relieve the siege of Kimberley, but their path was blocked at Magersfontein by a Boer force that was entrenched in the surrounding hills. The British had already fought a series of battles with the Boers, most recently at Modder River, where the advance was temporarily halted.

Lord Methuen failed to perform adequate reconnaissance in preparation for the impending battle and was unaware that Boer Vecht-generaal (Combat General) De la Rey had entrenched his forces at the foot of the hills, rather than the forward slopes, as was the accepted practice. That allowed the Boers to survive the initial British artillery bombardment, and when the British troops failed to deploy from a compact formation during their advance, the defenders inflicted heavy casualties. The Highland Brigade suffered the worst casualties, and on the Boer side, the Scandinavian Corps was destroyed. The Boers attained a tactical victory and succeeded in holding the British in their advance on Kimberley. The battle was the second of three battles during what became known as the Black Week of the Second Boer War.

Following their defeat, the British delayed at the Modder River for another two months while reinforcements were brought forward. General Lord Roberts was appointed Commander in Chief of the British forces in South Africa and moved to take personal command of the front. He subsequently lifted the siege of Kimberley and forced Cronje to surrender at the Battle of Paardeberg.

Background
In the early days of the war in the Cape Colony, the Boers surrounded and laid siege to the British garrisons in the towns of Kimberley and Mafeking and destroyed the railway bridge across the Orange River at Hopetown. Substantial British reinforcements (an army corps under General Redvers Buller) arrived in South Africa and were dispersed to three main fronts. While Buller himself advanced from the port of Durban in Natal to relieve the besieged town of Ladysmith and a smaller detachment under Lieutenant General Gatacre secured the Cape Midlands, the reinforced 1st Division under Lord Methuen advanced from the Orange River to relieve Kimberley.

Methuen advanced along the Cape–Transvaal railway line because a lack of water and pack animals made the reliable railway an obvious choice. Also, Buller had given him orders to evacuate the civilians in Kimberley and the railway was the only means of mass transport available. But his strategy had the disadvantage of making the direction of his approach obvious. Nevertheless, his army drove the Boers out of their defensive positions along the railway line at Belmont, Graspan, and the Modder River, at the cost of a thousand casualties. The British were forced to stop their advance within  of Kimberley at the Modder River crossing. The Boers had demolished the railway bridge when they retreated, and it had to be repaired before the army could advance any further. Methuen also needed several days for supplies and reinforcements to be brought forward, and for his extended supply line to be secured from sabotage. The Boers were badly shaken by their three successive defeats and also required time to recover. The delay gave them time to bring up reinforcements, to reorganise, and to improve their next line of defence at Magersfontein.

Prelude

Boer defences
After the Battle of the Modder River, the Boers initially retreated to Jacobsdal, where a commando from Mafeking linked up with them. Although closer to the British camp than the Boer camp, Jacobsdal was left poorly defended, and continued to function as the Boers' supply base until 3 December.

The Free State government decided to reinforce Cronje's position after the Battle of Belmont.  Between eight hundred and a thousand men of the Heilbron, Kroonstad and Bethlehem commandos arrived at Spytfontein from Natal, accompanied by elements of the Ficksburg and Ladybrand commandos from the Basuto border. Reinforcements were also brought up from the Bloemhof and Wolmaranstad commandos who were besieging Kimberley. The remainder of Cronje's force arrived from the siege of Mafeking.  Their force now numbered 8,500 fighters, excluding camp followers and the African labourers who performed the actual work of digging the Boer entrenchments.

Koos de la Rey had been absent from the army immediately after the Battle of the Modder River, having gone to Jacobsdal to bury his son Adriaan, who had been killed by a British shell during the battle. He arrived at the defensive positions on 1 December and surveyed the Boer lines the following day.  He found the defences lacking, and realised that Cronje's position at Spytfontein was vulnerable to long range artillery fire from the hills at Magersfontein.  He therefore recommended that they should move their defensive position forward to Magersfontein, to deny the British this opportunity. Cronje, who was the more senior officer, disagreed with him, so De la Rey telegraphed his objections to President Martinus Theunis Steyn of the Orange Free State.  After consulting with President Paul Kruger of the Transvaal, Steyn visited the front on 4 December at Kruger's suggestion. Steyn also wished to settle a rift that had developed between the Transvaal and Free State Boers over the poor performance of his Free Staters in the battle on 28 November. He spent the next day touring the camps and defences, then summoned a krijgsraad (council of war).

The Boers had learnt in earlier battles that the British artillery was superior in numbers to theirs, and could pound any high ground where they placed their guns or rifle pits. At Ladysmith, the Boers used rocks to build defensive sangars, but the ground at Magersfontein was sandy and less rocky. De la Rey recommended, contrary to common practice, that they should entrench themselves forward of the line of kopjes, rather than on the facing slopes. The trenches overlooking the receding, open ground sloping down towards the British axis of advance afforded the Boers concealment and protection from fire, and permitted them to use the flat trajectory of their Mauser rifles to greater effect. Since the trenches were concealed, they could thwart the standard British tactic of advancing to within close range under cover of darkness and then storming the Boer position at daybreak. A final consequence of De la Rey's defensive layout was that the troops would not be able to retreat, as Commandant General Marthinus Prinsloo's forces had done at Modder River. Before leaving the front, Steyn raised the morale of the Free State burghers by dismissing Prinsloo, who was seen as the chief reason for the defeats in earlier battles.

The trenches that were to protect the left flank in the direction of the river were not completed before the battle commenced. Two high wire fences complemented the natural obstacles created by the thick scrub bush. One ran north-northeast and marked the border of the Orange Free State, while a second protected the trenches in front of the Boer position.

British plan

No serviceable maps were available; those in the possession of the British officers had been prepared for the purposes of land registration, with no consideration of military operations. Officers supplemented these maps with hasty sketches based on limited daily reconnaissance. The poor maps and lack of reconnaissance would prove critical to the outcome of the battle.

Ever since the victory against an Egyptian army at the Battle of Tel-el-Kebir, the standard British tactic against an entrenched position was an approach march at night in close order to maintain cohesion, followed by deployment into open order within a few hundred yards of the objective and a frontal attack with the bayonet at first light. Methuen planned to bombard the Boer positions with artillery from 16:50 to 18:30 on 10 December. Following the barrage, the newly arrived Highland Brigade under Major General Wauchope was to make a night march that would position them to launch a frontal attack on the Boers at dawn the following day. Wauchope had argued for a flanking attack along the Modder River, but had been unable to convince his superior.

Methuen's orders show that his intention was to "hold the enemy on the north and to deliver an attack on the southern end of Magersfontein Ridge." The advance was to be made in three columns. The first column consisted of the Highland Brigade, the 9th Lancers, the 2nd King's Own Yorkshire Light Infantry, and supporting artillery and engineer sections as well as a balloon section. The first column was ordered to march directly on the south-western spur of the kopje and on arrival, before dawn, the 2nd Black Watch were to move east of the kopje, where he believed the Boers had a strong-point. He ordered the 2nd Seaforth Highlanders to advance to the south-eastern point of the hill, and the 1st Argyll and Sutherland Highlanders to extend the line to the left. The 1st Highland Light Infantry was to advance as a reserve. The second column, on the left under Major-General Reginald Pole-Carew, consisted of a battalion from the 9th Brigade, the Naval Brigade with a 4.7-inch naval gun, and Rimington's Guides (a mounted infantry unit raised in Cape Town). The third column, led by Major-General Sir Henry Edward Colville, was in reserve and was composed of the 12th Lancers, the Guards Brigade, and artillery, engineer, and medical support elements.

Advance to attack

A drizzle started by mid-afternoon on 10 December and continued throughout the artillery bombardment, which was delivered by 24 field guns, four howitzers, and a 4.7-inch naval gun. In preparation for the attack, the British soldiers bivouacked in the rain  from the Boer lines. Instead of "softening" the Boer positions, the explosions of lyddite shells against the facing slopes above their trenches merely alerted the Boers to the impending attack. As midnight approached, the rain increased to a downpour and the leading elements of the Highland Brigade commenced their advance towards their objective at the southern end of Magersfontein ridge. Wauchope had made a similar night march in his advance on Omdurman in 1898, but this time he was faced not by flat desert terrain and clear skies, but rather by torrential rain, rocky outcrops, and thorn scrub, which caused delays and annoyance. The thunderstorm and the high iron ore content of the surrounding hills played havoc with compasses and navigation.

The brigade was advancing in quarter column as directed by Methuen's orders.  The soldiers advanced packed as closely together as possible, with each ordered to grasp his neighbour to prevent the men losing contact with each other in the darkness. As first light approached, the storm abated and the Brigade was on course, but the delays put them  from the line of hills. Wauchope's guide, Major Benson of the Royal Artillery, suggested to Wauchope that it was no longer safe to continue in closed formation and that the Brigade should deploy. Wauchope replied "... I'm afraid my men will lose direction. I think we will go a little further." Still in quarter column, the Highlanders advanced further towards the unknown enemy lines, when an advancing British soldier tripped an alarm on the fence in front of the Boer trench.

Battle

Highland Brigade trapped

The Highlanders had advanced to within  of the Boer trenches when the Boers opened fire; the British had no time to reform from their compact quarter columns into a fighting formation. Wauchope instructed the brigade to extend its order, but in the face of such close-range Boer fire, the changing formation was thrown into disarray and confusion. General Wauchope was killed by almost the first volley, as was Lieutenant-Colonel G. L. J. Goff, the commanding officer of the Argylls. The men at the head of the brigade disentangled themselves from the dead and most of them fled. Some of the Black Watch at the head of the column charged the Boer trenches; a few broke through, but as they climbed Magersfontein Hill they were engaged by their own artillery and Boer parties, including one led by General Cronje himself, who had been wandering the kopje since 01:00, and were subsequently killed or captured. Others were shot while entangled in the wire fence in front of the trenches. Conan Doyle points out that 700 of the British casualties that day occurred in the first five minutes of the engagement.

An attempt was made to outflank the trenches on the right where a number of Boers were taken prisoner, but this action was soon blocked by the redeployment of Boer elements. After sunrise, the remnants of the four battalions of the Highland Brigade were unable to advance or retreat due to Boer rifle fire. The only movement at that time was a team led by Lt. Lindsay, who managed to bring the Seaforth's Maxim forward to provide a degree of fire support. Later the Lancers were able to bring their Maxim forward and into action as well. The Horse Artillery advanced to the southern flank in an attempt to enfilade the trenches. With all guns engaged, including the 4.7-inch naval gun commanded by Captain Bearcroft RN, the Highlanders were given some respite from the Boer small-arms fire, and some men were able to withdraw. As with the preliminary barrage of the previous evening, most of the shot was however again directed at the facing slopes of the hills rather than the Boer trenches at their foot.

Reinforcements arrive
As the day progressed, British reinforcements that were originally left to guard the camp near the Modder River started to arrive—first the Gordon Highlanders and later the 1st and 2nd Coldstream Guards. At the same time, Cronjé launched a fresh attack on the British southern (right) flank in an attempt to extend a salient to the left and behind the remaining Highlanders, cutting them off from the main British force. Initially the Seaforths attempted to stem this attack and ran into the Scandinavian Corps, which they quickly neutralised.  The Seaforths then had to regroup, which prevented them from further action to halt the Boer attempts to encircle the Highland Brigade. The Grenadier Guards, with five companies of the King's Own Yorkshire Light Infantry, were moved to counter the attack.  The British only showed some sign of success after the freshly arrived battalions of the Coldstream Guards were committed too.  But once the Coldstreams were committed, Methuen had engaged all of his reserves.

The remaining Highlanders, now under the command of Lieutenant Colonel James Hughes-Hallet of the Seaforths, had been lying prone under a harsh summer sun for most of the day with the Boers still attempting to encircle them from the south. In the late afternoon, those who remained alive stood up and fled west towards the main body of British troops. This unexpected move left many of the field guns which had been advanced to the front line over the course of the morning exposed to the Boers.  Only a lack of initiative on the part of the Boers saved the guns from being captured.  The gap created by the hurried withdrawal of the Highland Brigade was filled by the Gordons and the Scots Guards.

Scandinavian volunteers

The Scandinavian Volunteer Corps (Skandinaviska Kåren) was not a true corps but rather a unit the size of a company, consisting of foreign volunteers.  Approximately half of the Corps (refer to the Order of battle) was ordered to hold a forward position in the gap between the high ground held by Cronje and De la Rey's forces during the night of 10–11 December. The rest of the force was entrenched in defensive positions some  further north-east. In the early morning hours of 11 December, General Cronje ordered Commandant Tolly de Beer to abandon the outpost, but for some reason the order did not reach the Scandinavian section, which was left on its own. Save for seven men, this section was destroyed while valiantly holding back the attack of the Seaforth Highlanders, who were in the process denied access between the hills and prevented from reaching the Boer guns. Cronje understood the significance of this stand, and said in a subsequent letter to Kruger that "next to God we can thank the Scandinavians for our victory".

Final retreat
In the late afternoon, a Boer messenger bearing a white flag arrived at a Scots Guard outpost to say that the British could send ambulances to collect their wounded lying in front of the trenches at the foot of the hills. Royal Army Medical Corps and Boer medical orderlies treated the wounded until the truce was broken by fire from the British naval gun, Captain (RN) Bearcroft not having been informed of the temporary armistice. A British medical orderly was sent to the Boers with apologies, and the truce was reinstated. When the truce was officially over, G Battery RHA, the 62nd Field Battery, and the Argyll and Sutherland Highlanders were tasked to screen the reorganisation and withdrawal of some of the British troops.

The Boer guns, which had not yet seen action that day, opened fire on the cavalry at about 17:30 and the center of the British attack began to fall back. Men instinctively withdrew to beyond the range of the Boer guns; Methuen decided that a total withdrawal was preferable to his troops spending the night near the Boer trenches. Battalions and remnants of battalions retreated throughout the night and were mustered for roll call at the Modder River camp the next morning.

Aftermath

Tactical dispositions

The Boers halted Methuen's advance to relieve the siege of Kimberley, defeated his superior force and inflicted heavy losses, particularly on the Highland Brigade. The British were forced to withdraw to the Modder River to regroup and to await further reinforcements. Unlike previous occasions, where the Boers withdrew after an engagement, this time Cronje held the Magersfontein defence line, knowing that Methuen would again be forced to continue his advance along his logistical railway "lifeline".

Losses
The British lost 22 officers and 188 other ranks killed, 46 officers and 629 other ranks wounded, and one officer and 62 other ranks missing. Of this, the Highland Brigade suffered losses of 747 men being killed, wounded, and missing.  Among the battalions, the Black Watch suffered the most severely, losing 303 officers and other ranks. On 12 December, when British ambulances again went forward to collect the dead and remaining wounded, they found Wauchope's body within  of Cronjé's trenches. The British camp at Modder River, and subsequently at Paardeberg, created ideal conditions for the spread of typhoid fever.  By the time the British reached Bloemfontein, an epidemic had broken out amongst the troops, with 10,000–12,000 taken ill, and 1,200 deaths in the city. The disease ultimately took more British lives during the war than were lost through enemy action.

The animosity that the troops on the ground felt towards their leadership is captured in this contemporary poem by a soldier of the Black Watch:

Boer losses are disputed.  The official British account of the battle records 87 killed and 188 wounded, while later accounts record a total loss of 236 men. As with the Boers, several different figures regarding the strength of the Scandinavian outpost exist. British sources quote 80 men and Scandinavian sources between 49 and 52 men. Uddgren records 52 men based on identified names, consisting of 26 Swedes, 11 Danes, 7 Finns, 4 Norwegians, and 4 of unknown nationality, of whom all but five were either killed, wounded or captured.

Strategic consequences

The week from 10 to 17 December 1899 rapidly became known to troops in the field—and to politicians in Britain—as "Black Week", during which the British suffered three defeats: the battles of Stormberg in the Cape Midlands and Colenso in Natal, as well as the Battle of Magersfontein. The defeat at Magersfontein caused much consternation in Britain, particularly in Scotland, where the losses to the Highland regiments were keenly felt. Wauchope was well known in Scotland, having stood as a Parliamentary candidate for Midlothian in the general election of 1892.

The reverberations of the Black Week defeats led to the hasty approval of large reinforcements being sent to South Africa, from both Britain and the Dominions. Although Cronje temporarily defeated the British and held up their advance, General Lord Roberts was appointed as overall Commander in Chief in South Africa; he took personal command on this front, and at the head of an army reinforced to 25,000 men, he relieved Kimberley on 15 February 1900. Cronje's retreating army was surrounded and forced to surrender at the Battle of Paardeberg on 27 February 1900.

Lord Methuen later salvaged his reputation and career through successes he achieved against George Villebois-Mareuil at the Battle of Boschoff. However, he was the only general captured by the Boers during the war.

Victoria Cross awards
Three Victoria Cross citations were made for the action at Magersfontein:
 Lieutenant Henry Edward Manning Douglas. Royal Army Medical Corps
 Corporal John Shaul. Highland Light Infantry
 Captain Ernest Beachcroft Beckwith Towse. Gordon Highlanders

Order of battle

British Forces

The 3rd Highland Brigade was attached to the 1st Infantry Division from the 9th Infantry Division

The below units were deployed for communication line protection duties and as such were under command of Major-General Methuen.

Boer Forces

Notes

References

Sources

Further reading

External links

 

Conflicts in 1899
1899 in the Cape Colony
Battles of the Second Boer War
Battles involving the United Kingdom
History of the Northern Cape
Kimberley, Northern Cape
Karoo
December 1899 events
Orders of battle